The Wrath of Olympus is an adventure module published in 1987 for the Dungeons & Dragons fantasy role-playing game.

Plot summary
The Wrath of Olympus is an adventure scenario using the Dungeons & Dragons Immortals Set, in which the player characters save Immortals held captive by the demons of entropy.

Publication history
IM2 The Wrath of Olympus was written by Robert J. Blake, with a cover by Keith Parkinson and interior illustrations by George Barr, and was published by TSR in 1987 as a 48-page booklet with an outer folder.

Reception
In his review for the Immortals Rules set in Dragon magazine #127 (November 1987), Ken Rolston mentions Bob Blake's Wrath of Olympus as "The best example of how Immortals could fit into a campaign", noting that the module "doesn't make the role of Immortals as gods much clearer, but does show how the rules can be used to produce a pretty interesting megalevel adventure".

References

Dungeons & Dragons modules
Mystara
Role-playing game supplements introduced in 1987